Jefferson Township is a township in Polk County, Iowa, United States.

History
Jefferson Township was established in 1851. The town of Herrold was established in the township in 1915 and purchased by the U.S. Army Corps of Engineers in 1990 for use as a military exercise range for Camp Dodge.

References

Townships in Polk County, Iowa
Townships in Iowa
1851 establishments in Iowa
Populated places established in 1851